Haloceratidae is a family of sea snails, marine gastropod molluscs in the superfamily Vanikoroidea.

Genera 
Genera within the family Haloceratidae include:
 Haloceras Dall, 1889
 Zygoceras Warén & Bouchet, 1991

References 

 Beesley, P. L.; Ross, G. J. B. & Wells, A. (eds.) 1998. Mollusca: The Southern Synthesis. Fauna of Australia. Vol. 5, Part A. page(s): 769; note: placed in superfamily Vanikoroidea

External links
 The Taxonomicon
  Warén, A.; Bouchet, P. (1991). Mollusca Gastropoda: Systematic position and revision of Haloceras Dall, 1889 (Caenogastropoda, Haloceratidae fam. nov.). in: Crosnier, A. et al. (Ed.) Résultats des Campagnes MUSORSTOM 7. Mémoires du Muséum national d'Histoire naturelle. Série A, Zoologie. 150: 111-161

 
Vanikoroidea